The  was an army of the Imperial Japanese Army, responsible for defense of the northern region of the Japanese home islands, including Hokkaidō, Karafuto and the Chishima Islands.

History
On August 1, 1935 the Japanese home territories were divided administratively into six geographical regions for the purposes of recruiting, organizing civil defense and fortifications. On December 2, 1940, the Northern Army was raised under the overall jurisdiction of the General Defense Command. 
1 August 1941, the Northern  Army has lost the 57th division which was sent to Manchukuo.

Primarily a garrison and training force, on February 11, 1943, the Northern Army was renamed the Northern District Army, and came under the direct command of the Imperial General Headquarters.

Towards the end of World War II, as the situation looked increasingly desperate for Japan, the Northern Area Army became the Japanese Fifth Area Army on March 10, 1944.  It was reactivated as the Northern District Army on February 1, 1945 as a headquarters and administrative command, with its forces concurrent with the Japanese Fifth Area Army

List of commanders

Commanding officers

Chief of staff

References

External links

Northern
Military units and formations established in 1940
Military units and formations disestablished in 1945